The Dangerous Game (Swedish: Den farliga leken) is a 1933 Swedish comedy film directed by Weyler Hildebrand and starring Edvard Persson, Doris Nelson and Eivor Kjellström.

The film's art direction was by Bibi Lindström.

Cast
 Edvard Persson as Vredberg  
 Doris Nelson as Mrs. Vredberg 
 Eivor Kjellström as Rut Vredberg  
 Åke Ohberg as Bruce  
 Anders Frithiof as Smith  
 Marianne Löfgren as Margit Smith 
 Gustaf Wally as Mr. Wallenberg  
 Harry Ahlin as Wigert  
 Åke Söderblom as Klang 
 Margit Rosengren as Lola Brio

See also
 Business Under Distress (1931)
 Wehe, wenn er losgelassen (1932)
 Josef the Chaste (1953)

References

Bibliography 
 Qvist, Per Olov & von Bagh, Peter. Guide to the Cinema of Sweden and Finland. Greenwood Publishing Group, 2000.

External links 
 

1933 films
1933 comedy films
Swedish comedy films
1930s Swedish-language films
Films directed by Weyler Hildebrand
Swedish films based on plays
Swedish black-and-white films
1930s Swedish films